Dayron Alexander Pérez Calle (born 24 December 1978) is a Colombian football manager and former player who played as a midfielder.

Playing career
Born in Medellín, Pérez started his career with Once Caldas, but only featured rarely for the first team during his first spell. He then represented Venezuelan sides Estudiantes de Mérida and Deportivo Italchacao before returning to his home country with Boyacá Chicó.

In 2008, Pérez returned to Once Caldas, and featured regularly before losing his starting spot and moving to Deportivo Pereira in the middle of 2010. In January 2011, he agreed to a deal with América de Cali, but the move was later declared void after being deemed surplus to requirements by manager Álvaro Aponte; the player, however, stated that he was "lied to" by the board of the club.

Pérez subsequently joined Cúcuta Deportivo, being a regular starter before moving to Atlético Huila for the 2013 campaign. After leaving the latter club in 2014, he subsequently represented Águilas Doradas and Jaguares de Córdoba, retiring with the latter in 2016.

Managerial career
Shortly after retiring, Pérez returned to former club Atlético Huila, being named assistant manager Oswaldo Duran and later manager of their youth sides. On 10 September 2018, he was named interim manager after Néstor Craviotto was sacked.

Pérez returned to his former role after the appointment of Luis Fernando Herrera in March 2019, but was again named interim in October after Jorge Luis Bernal was dismissed. He then returned to his previous role for the 2020 campaign, after the appointment of Flavio Robatto.

On 30 September 2020, Pérez was definitely appointed manager in the place of Robatto who resigned a few days later.

Honours

Player
Once Caldas
Categoría Primera A: 2009

Manager
Atlético Huila
Categoría Primera B: 2020

References

External links

1978 births
Living people
People from Medellín
Colombian footballers
Association football midfielders
Categoría Primera A players
Once Caldas footballers
Deportivo Pereira footballers
Cúcuta Deportivo footballers
Atlético Huila footballers
Águilas Doradas Rionegro players
Jaguares de Córdoba footballers
Deportivo Miranda F.C. players
Venezuelan Primera División players
Estudiantes de Mérida players
Colombian expatriate footballers
Colombian expatriate sportspeople in Venezuela
Expatriate footballers in Venezuela
Colombian football managers
Atlético Huila managers